Epipodocarpus andinus is a species of beetle in the family Cerambycidae, the only species in the genus Epipodocarpus.

References

Tillomorphini
Monotypic Cerambycidae genera